Alanson is both a given name and a surname. Notable people with the name include:

Given name:
Alanson W. Beard (1825–1900), American politician
Alanson Beers (1808–1853), American pioneer and politician
Alanson Cooke (1811–1904), Canadian businessman and politician
Alanson B. Houghton (1863–1941), American businessman, politician and diplomat
Alanson M. Kimball (1827–1913), American politician
Alanson Merwin Randol (1837–1887), Union Army officer
Alanson Skinner (1794–1876), American manufacturer and politician
Alanson Sweet (1804–1891), American pioneer, businessman and politician
Alanson Weeks (1877–1947), American football player

Surname:
Mazhar Alanson (born 1950), Turkish musician and actor
Robert Alanson, 16th-century English politician
William Alanson, 16th-century English politician